The Oconee Street School, at 594 Oconee St in Athens, Georgia was built in 1908.  It was listed on the National Register of Historic Places in 2018.

It is a masonry building.

It was used as a school until around 1971.

In 2017, there were plans for it to be converted into 16 apartments.

References

		
School buildings completed in 1908
National Register of Historic Places in Clarke County, Georgia
Schools in Georgia (U.S. state)
1908 establishments in Georgia (U.S. state)